There are two sections listed below: List of Downtown Historic District Buildings in Carmel-by-the-Sea, California, based on the Downtown Conservation District Historic Property Survey, and Other Other Historic Buildings in Carmel. 

DPR stands for Department of Parks and Recreation.

Table key
 Listed as a California Historical Landmark

Downtown Historic District Buildings in Carmel-by-the-Sea

Other Historic Buildings in Carmel

See also
 National Register of Historic Places listings in Monterey County, California
 California Historical Landmarks in Monterey County
 California Register of Historical Resources
 List of Historic Homes in Carmel Point

References

External links

City of Carmel
Downtown Conservation District Historic Property Survey
Historic Preservation

California State Parks
Office of Historic Preservation (OHP) 
California Register of Historical Resources
Built Environment Resources Directory (BERD)
California Historical Resources Information System (CHRIS)
CHRIS Information Center Locations and Contacts
California Historical Resource Status Codes

National Park Service
National Register Database and Research
NPGallery Digital Asset Management System

Carmel-by-the-Sea, California
Buildings and structures in Monterey County, California